Cornelia Friederica Christiana Schlosser (née Goethe; 7 December 1750 – 8 June 1777) was the sister and only sibling of Johann Wolfgang von Goethe who survived to adulthood.

Life 

Cornelia Goethe, 15 months younger than her brother Johann Wolfgang, was born in Frankfurt am Main. Her father, imperial councillor Johann Caspar Goethe (29 July 171025 May 1782), thought it appropriate for an upper-class woman to have some higher education, and Cornelia was educated together with her brother, which was unusual in those days. At the age of three, she was sent to a kindergarten school, where she learnt reading and writing with Magdalena Hoff. From the age of seven, she and her brother were taught together by a tutor, Johann Heinrich Thym. Latin and ancient Greek were the first languages she was taught, and two years later, she also began receiving French lessons. She also learnt English, Italian, law, geography, mathematics, and calligraphy, as well as singing, piano, and drawing. She also learnt fencing and horseriding, and received lessons in dance and etiquette. In her leisure time, she pursued literary interests, which she discussed with her brother.

Cornelia did not fit into the relaxed environment of that time due to her serious and hypochondriac nature. She did not relate well to her parents, as there were significant differences between her personality and that of her mother Catharina Elisabeth Goethe (1731 - 1808), who was known as the cheerful "Frau Rat" ("Lady Councillor"), and as she did not forgive her father for having overburdened her with studies and thus having robbed her of some joys of childhood. She could relate better to her brother, who understood her and did not ignore her interest in intellectual pursuits. She had a good relationship with Johann Wolfgang and turned out to be a source of love, comfort, and support for him when he was plagued by fears and self-reproach after his relationship with his girlfriend Gretchen ended. Goethe's relationship with Gretchen had led him to move in circles that were involved in somewhat criminal activities. These circumstances laid the foundations for a deep friendship between Cornelia and Johann Wolfgang. Of all relationships in her life, Cornelia's relationship with her brother was the closest and a source of great happiness for her. Her circle of friends consisted of women who were enjoying the exuberance of youth and did not fear her as a rival.

When Johann Wolfgang went to Leipzig to study law, Cornelia stayed at home in Frankfurt. Johann Wolfgang's three years in Leipzig interrupted the siblings' daily contact for the first time. Cornelia observed that her brother adopted the prevalent attitude of the time toward women, that is, one in which women were considered subordinate to men. She took great interest in her brother's literary accomplishments and was often the first to know about his plans, drafts, and revisions. Letters from this time that she wrote to her friend Katharina Fabricius in French have been preserved. Cornelia suffered the disadvantages of being a woman at that time, but did not see an alternative to marriage: Es ist offensichtlich, daß ich nicht immer Mädchen bleiben kann, überdies wäre es sehr lächerlich, sich das vorzunehmen. ("It is obvious that I cannot stay a girl all my life, and planning to do so would be ridiculous."). She married Johann Georg Schlosser, a jurist, and had two daughters, Maria Anne Louise and Catharina Elisabeth Julie.

She died in Emmendingen at the age of 26.

Legacy 

The interdisciplinary Cornelia Goethe Center for Women's and Gender Studies at the University of Frankfurt is named after her, as is the Cornelia Goethe Prize that it awards.

References

Sources

External links 

 

 
 FemBiographie Cornelia Goethe, verh. Schlosser 
 Bildergalerie zu Cornelia und ihrer Familie 
 J. M. R. Lenz' Gedicht ''Willkommen kleine Bürgerin 

1750 births
1777 deaths
German letter writers
Women letter writers
18th-century German writers
18th-century German women writers